Sabrina Cass (born 27 March 2002) is an American-born Brazilian freestyle skier. She competed in the 2022 Winter Olympics.

Career
Cass won a gold medal at the 2019 Junior World Championships in the moguls event. She finished 21st out of 30 competitors in the first qualifying round and then 16th out of 20 competitors in the second qualifying round in the women's moguls event at the 2022 Winter Olympics, failing to qualify for the finals.

Personal life
Cass was born and raised in the United States but was eligible to represent Brazil due to having a Brazilian mother. She represented the United States until switching allegiances to Brazil in 2021. She alternated living between Cheshire, Connecticut and Park City, Utah in order to train. She also played field hockey in high school.

References

2002 births
Living people
People with acquired Brazilian citizenship
Brazilian female freestyle skiers
Olympic freestyle skiers of Brazil
Freestyle skiers at the 2022 Winter Olympics
Brazilian people of American descent
People from Cheshire, Connecticut
Sportspeople from New Haven County, Connecticut
People from Park City, Utah
Sportspeople from Utah
American female freestyle skiers
American sportspeople of Brazilian descent